"Blue Bandana" is a song recorded by American country music artist Jerrod Niemann. It was released in July 2015.  The song was written by Ben Goldsmith, C.J. Solar and Andrew Scott Wills.

Critical reception
Billy Dukes of Taste of Country gave the song a positive review, saying that "Jerrod Niemann sings of a free spirit in his new song “Blue Bandana,” but she’s something of a metaphor for lost youth. The girl in the blue bandana is a gypsy committed only to the wispy impulses of the wind. By the end of the song she’s slipped away.

Music video
The music video was directed by P. R. Brown and premiered in August 2015.

Chart performance

References

2015 songs
2015 singles
Jerrod Niemann songs
Arista Nashville singles
Songs written by C.J. Solar